Route 234, also known as Winter Brook Road, is a  east–west highway on the island of Newfoundland in the province of Newfoundland and Labrador. It is located along the Bonavista Peninsula, connecting Winter Brook with Lethbridge.

Route description

Route 234 begins at an intersection with Route 230 (Bonavista Peninsula Highway/Discovery Trail) in Lethbridge. It has an intersection with a local road that passes through downtown before leaving Lethbridge and heading north. The highway now has two intersections with a loop road passing through Brooklyn before passing northeast along the coastline of Goose Bay to pass through Portland. Route 234 now turns away from the coast as it passes through Jamestown and goes east through wooded areas for a few kilometres before entering Winter Brook and coming to a dead end in a cul-de-sac.

Major intersections

References

234